Tetraschalis lemurodes is a moth of the family Pterophoridae. It is known from New Guinea.

References

External links
Papua Insects

Pterophorinae
Moths described in 1908
Taxa named by Edward Meyrick
Moths of New Guinea